Garry C. Piiparinen is an American politician and former Wyoming state legislator. A member of the Republican Party, Piiparinen represented the 49th district in the Wyoming House of Representatives from 2013 to 2021.

Education
Piiparinen attended Wayne State University, the University of Wyoming, Michigan State University, and earned his BS in elementary education from Brigham Young University, and his MA in educational administration from Western New Mexico University.

Elections
2012 Challenging incumbent Representative Clarence Vranish for the House District 49 seat, Piiparinen won the August 21, 2012 Republican Primary with 704 votes (56.3%) against Vranish, and was unopposed for the November 6, 2012 General election, winning with 2,881 votes.

Personal life
Piiparinen is a member of the Church of Jesus Christ of Latter-day Saints.

References

External links
Official page at the Wyoming Legislature
 

Place of birth missing (living people)
Year of birth missing (living people)
Living people
Latter Day Saints from Wyoming
Brigham Young University alumni
Republican Party members of the Wyoming House of Representatives
Michigan State University alumni
People from Uinta County, Wyoming
University of Wyoming alumni
Wayne State University alumni
Western New Mexico University alumni
21st-century American politicians